This is a list of lighthouses in  Kiritimati (Christmas Island).

Lighthouses

See also
 Lists of lighthouses and lightvessels

References

External links
 

Christmas Island
Lighthouses, Christmas Island